Federal Highway 135D is a toll highway connecting Cuacnopalan, Puebla to Oaxaca City and bypassing Tehuacán, Puebla. The road is operated by Caminos y Puentes Federales, which charges a toll of 200 pesos per car to travel Highway 135D.

Route description
Highway 135D begins at an interchange with Highway 150D at Cuacnopalan, proceeding southward as the primary bypass of Tehuacán. Travelers can enter the city via interchanges with Highways 150 and 125. Past Tehuacán, there are few towns on the road, with the primary highlights being access to Asunción Nochixtlán, Oaxaca, and the toll road's end northwest of Oaxaca City.

References 

Mexican Federal Highways